In number theory, the law of quadratic reciprocity is a theorem about modular arithmetic that gives conditions for the solvability of quadratic equations modulo prime numbers. Due to its subtlety, it has many formulations, but the most standard statement is: 

This law, together with its supplements, allows the easy calculation of any Legendre symbol, making it possible to determine whether there is an integer solution for any quadratic equation of the form  for an odd prime ; that is, to determine the "perfect squares" modulo . However, this is a non-constructive result: it gives no help at all for finding a specific solution; for this, other methods are required. For example, in the case  using Euler's criterion one can give an explicit formula for the "square roots" modulo  of a quadratic residue , namely,

indeed,

This formula only works if it is known in advance that  is a quadratic residue, which can be checked using the law of quadratic reciprocity.

The quadratic reciprocity theorem was conjectured by Euler and Legendre and first proved by Gauss, who referred to it as the "fundamental theorem" in his Disquisitiones Arithmeticae and his papers, writing

The fundamental theorem must certainly be regarded as one of the most elegant of its type. (Art. 151)

Privately, Gauss referred to it as the "golden theorem". He published six proofs for it, and two more were found in his posthumous papers. There are now over 240 published proofs. The shortest known proof is included below, together with short proofs of the law's supplements (the Legendre symbols of −1 and 2).

Generalizing the reciprocity law to higher powers has been a leading problem in mathematics, and has been crucial to the development of much of the machinery of modern algebra, number theory, and algebraic geometry, culminating in Artin reciprocity, class field theory, and the Langlands program.

Motivating examples
Quadratic reciprocity arises from certain subtle factorization patterns involving perfect square numbers. In this section, we give examples which lead to the general case.

Factoring n2 − 5
Consider the polynomial  and its values for  The prime factorizations of these values are given as follows:

Now,  is a prime factor of some  whenever , i.e. whenever  i.e. whenever 5 is a quadratic residue modulo .

Patterns among quadratic residues
Let p be an odd prime. A number modulo p is a quadratic residue whenever it is congruent to a square (mod p); otherwise it is a quadratic non-residue. ("Quadratic" can be dropped if it is clear from the context.) Here we exclude zero as a special case. Then as a consequence of the fact that the multiplicative group of a finite field of order p is cyclic of order p-1, the following statements hold:

There are an equal number of quadratic residues and non-residues; and
The product of two quadratic residues is a residue, the product of a residue and a non-residue is a non-residue, and the product of two non-residues is a residue.

For the avoidance of doubt, these statements do not hold if the modulus is not prime. 
For example, there are only 3 quadratic residues (1, 4 and 9) in the multiplicative group modulo 15. 
Moreover, although 7 and 8 are quadratic non-residues, their product 7x8 = 11 is also a quadratic non-residue, in contrast to the prime case.

Quadratic residues are entries in the following table:

This table is complete for odd primes less than 50. To check whether a number m is a quadratic residue mod one of these primes p, find a ≡ m (mod p) and 0 ≤ a < p. If a is in row p, then m is a residue (mod p); if a is not in row p of the table, then m is a nonresidue (mod p).

The quadratic reciprocity law is the statement that certain patterns found in the table are true in general.

Legendre's version
Another way to organize the data is to see which primes are residues mod which other primes, as illustrated in the following table. The entry in row p column q is R if q is a quadratic residue (mod p); if it is a nonresidue the entry is N.

If the row, or the column, or both, are ≡ 1 (mod 4) the entry is blue or green; if both row and column are ≡ 3 (mod 4), it is yellow or orange.

The blue and green entries are symmetric around the diagonal: The entry for row p, column q is R (resp N) if and only if the entry at row q, column p, is R (resp N).

The yellow and orange ones, on the other hand, are antisymmetric: The entry for row p, column q is R (resp N) if and only if the entry at row q, column p, is N (resp R).

The reciprocity law states that these patterns hold for all p and q.

Supplements to Quadratic Reciprocity

The supplements provide solutions to specific cases of quadratic reciprocity. They are often quoted as partial results, without having to resort to the complete theorem.

q = ±1 and the first supplement

Trivially 1 is a quadratic residue for all primes. The question becomes more interesting for −1. Examining the table, we find −1 in rows 5, 13, 17, 29, 37, and 41 but not in rows 3, 7, 11, 19, 23, 31, 43 or 47. The former set of primes are all congruent to 1 modulo 4, and the latter are congruent to 3 modulo 4.

First Supplement to Quadratic Reciprocity. The congruence  is solvable if and only if  is congruent to 1 modulo 4.

q = ±2 and the second supplement
Examining the table, we find 2 in rows 7, 17, 23, 31, 41, and 47, but not in rows 3, 5, 11, 13, 19, 29, 37, or 43. The former primes are all ≡ ±1 (mod 8), and the latter are all ≡ ±3 (mod 8). This leads to

Second Supplement to Quadratic Reciprocity. The congruence  is solvable if and only if  is congruent to ±1 modulo 8.

−2 is in rows 3, 11, 17, 19, 41, 43, but not in rows 5, 7, 13, 23, 29, 31, 37, or 47. The former are ≡ 1 or ≡ 3 (mod 8), and the latter are ≡ 5, 7 (mod 8).

q = ±3
3 is in rows 11, 13, 23, 37, and 47, but not in rows 5, 7, 17, 19, 29, 31, 41, or 43. The former are ≡ ±1 (mod 12) and the latter are all ≡ ±5 (mod 12).

−3 is in rows 7, 13, 19, 31, 37, and 43 but not in rows 5, 11, 17, 23, 29, 41, or 47. The former are ≡ 1 (mod 3) and the latter ≡ 2 (mod 3).

Since the only residue (mod 3) is 1, we see that −3 is a quadratic residue modulo every prime which is a residue modulo 3.

q = ±5
5 is in rows 11, 19, 29, 31, and 41 but not in rows 3, 7, 13, 17, 23, 37, 43, or 47. The former are ≡ ±1 (mod 5) and the latter are ≡ ±2 (mod 5).

Since the only residues (mod 5) are ±1, we see that 5 is a quadratic residue modulo every prime which is a residue modulo 5.

−5 is in rows 3, 7, 23, 29, 41, 43, and 47 but not in rows 11, 13, 17, 19, 31, or 37. The former are ≡ 1, 3, 7, 9 (mod 20) and the latter are ≡ 11, 13, 17, 19 (mod 20).

Higher q
The observations about −3 and 5 continue to hold: −7 is a residue modulo p if and only if p is a residue modulo 7, −11 is a residue modulo p if and only if p is a residue modulo 11, 13 is a residue (mod p) if and only if p is a residue modulo 13, etc. The more complicated-looking rules for the quadratic characters of 3 and −5, which depend upon congruences modulo 12 and 20 respectively, are simply the ones for −3 and 5 working with the first supplement.

Example. For −5 to be a residue (mod p), either both 5 and −1 have to be residues (mod p) or they both have to be non-residues: i.e., p ≡ ±1 (mod 5) and p ≡ 1 (mod 4) or p ≡ ±2 (mod 5) and p ≡ 3 (mod 4). Using the Chinese remainder theorem these are equivalent to p ≡ 1, 9 (mod 20) or p ≡ 3, 7 (mod 20).

The generalization of the rules for −3 and 5 is Gauss's statement of quadratic reciprocity.

Statement of the theorem

Quadratic Reciprocity (Gauss's statement). If , then the congruence  is solvable if and only if  is solvable.

Quadratic Reciprocity (combined statement). Define . Then the congruence  is solvable if and only if  is solvable.

Quadratic Reciprocity (Legendre's statement). If p or q are congruent to 1 modulo 4, then:  is solvable if and only if  is solvable. If p and q are congruent to 3 modulo 4, then:  is solvable if and only if  is not solvable.

The last is immediately equivalent to the modern form stated in the introduction above. It is a simple exercise to prove that Legendre's and Gauss's statements are equivalent – it requires no more than the first supplement and the facts about multiplying residues and nonresidues.

Proof

Apparently, the shortest known proof yet was published by B. Veklych in the American Mathematical Monthly.

Proofs of the supplements

by Euler's criterion, but both sides of this congruence are numbers of the form , so they must be equal.

And this equation can be solved in just the same way here as over the rational numbers: substitute , where we demand that  (leaving out the two solutions ), then the original equation transforms into

Here  can have any value that does not make the denominator zero – for which there are  possibilities (i.e.  if  is a residue,  if not) – and also does not make  zero, which excludes one more option, . Thus there are

Therefore,  is a residue modulo  if and only if  divides . This is a reformulation of the condition stated above.

History and alternative statements
The theorem was formulated in many ways before its modern form: Euler and Legendre did not have Gauss's congruence notation, nor did Gauss have the Legendre symbol.

In this article p and q always refer to distinct positive odd primes, and x and y to unspecified integers.

Fermat
Fermat proved (or claimed to have proved) a number of theorems about expressing a prime by a quadratic form:

He did not state the law of quadratic reciprocity, although the cases −1, ±2, and ±3 are easy deductions from these and other of his theorems.

He also claimed to have a proof that if the prime number p ends with 7, (in base 10) and the prime number q ends in 3, and p ≡ q ≡ 3 (mod 4), then

Euler conjectured, and Lagrange proved, that

Proving these and other statements of Fermat was one of the things that led mathematicians to the reciprocity theorem.

Euler
Translated into modern notation, Euler stated  that for distinct odd primes p and q:

 If q ≡ 1 (mod 4) then q is a quadratic residue (mod p) if and only if there exists some integer b such that p ≡ b2 (mod q).
 If q ≡ 3 (mod 4) then q is a quadratic residue (mod p) if and only if there exists some integer b which is odd and not divisible by q such that p ≡ ±b2 (mod 4q).

This is equivalent to quadratic reciprocity.

He could not prove it, but he did prove the second supplement.

Legendre and his symbol
Fermat proved that if p is a prime number and a is an integer, 

Thus if p does not divide a, using the non-obvious fact (see for example Ireland and Rosen below) that the residues modulo p form a field and therefore in particular the multiplicative group is cyclic, hence there can be at most two solutions to a quadratic equation:

Legendre lets a and A represent positive primes ≡ 1 (mod 4) and b and B positive primes ≡ 3 (mod 4), and sets out a table of eight theorems that together are equivalent to quadratic reciprocity:

He says that since expressions of the form

will come up so often he will abbreviate them as:

This is now known as the Legendre symbol, and an equivalent definition is used today: for all integers a and all odd primes p

Legendre's version of quadratic reciprocity

He notes that these can be combined:

A number of proofs, especially those based on Gauss's Lemma, explicitly calculate this formula.

The supplementary laws using Legendre symbols

From these two supplements, we can obtain a third reciprocity law for the quadratic character -2 as follows:

For -2 to be a quadratic residue, either -1 or 2 are both quadratic residues, or both non-residues :.

So either : are both even, or they are both odd. The sum of these two expressions is

 which is an integer. Therefore,

Legendre's attempt to prove reciprocity is based on a theorem of his:

Legendre's Theorem. Let a, b and c be integers where any pair of the three are relatively prime. Moreover assume that at least one of ab, bc or ca is negative (i.e. they don't all have the same sign). If 

are solvable then the following equation has a nontrivial solution in integers:

Example. Theorem I is handled by letting a ≡ 1 and b ≡ 3 (mod 4) be primes and assuming that  and, contrary the theorem, that  Then  has a solution, and taking congruences (mod 4) leads to a contradiction.

This technique doesn't work for Theorem VIII. Let b ≡ B ≡ 3 (mod 4), and assume

Then if there is another prime p ≡ 1 (mod 4) such that

the solvability of  leads to a contradiction (mod 4). But Legendre was unable to prove there has to be such a prime p; he was later able to show that all that is required is:

Legendre's Lemma. If p is a prime that is congruent to 1 modulo 4 then there exists an odd prime q such that 

but he couldn't prove that either. Hilbert symbol (below) discusses how techniques based on the existence of solutions to  can be made to work.

Gauss

Gauss first proves the supplementary laws. He sets the basis for induction by proving the theorem for ±3 and ±5. Noting that it is easier to state for −3 and +5 than it is for +3 or −5, he states the general theorem in the form:

If p is a prime of the form 4n + 1 then p, but if p is of the form 4n + 3 then −p, is a quadratic residue (resp. nonresidue) of every prime, which, with a positive sign, is a residue (resp. nonresidue) of p. In the next sentence, he christens it the "fundamental theorem" (Gauss never used the word "reciprocity").

Introducing the notation a R b (resp. a N b) to mean a is a quadratic residue (resp. nonresidue) (mod b), and letting a, a′, etc. represent positive primes ≡ 1 (mod 4) and b, b′, etc. positive primes ≡ 3 (mod 4), he breaks it out into the same 8 cases as Legendre:

In the next Article he generalizes this to what are basically the rules for the Jacobi symbol (below). Letting A, A′, etc. represent any (prime or composite) positive numbers ≡ 1 (mod 4) and B, B′, etc. positive numbers ≡ 3 (mod 4):

All of these cases take the form "if a prime is a residue (mod a composite), then the composite is a residue or nonresidue (mod the prime), depending on the congruences (mod 4)". He proves that these follow from cases 1) - 8).

Gauss needed, and was able to prove, a lemma similar to the one Legendre needed:

Gauss's Lemma. If p is a prime congruent to 1 modulo 8 then there exists an odd prime q such that:

The proof of quadratic reciprocity uses complete induction.

Gauss's Version in Legendre Symbols. 

These can be combined:

Gauss's Combined Version in Legendre Symbols. Let

In other words:

Then:

A number of proofs of the theorem, especially those based on Gauss sums or the splitting of primes in algebraic number fields, derive this formula.

Other statements
The statements in this section are equivalent to quadratic reciprocity: if, for example, Euler's version is assumed, the Legendre-Gauss version can be deduced from it, and vice versa.

Euler's Formulation of Quadratic Reciprocity. If  then 

This can be proven using Gauss's lemma.
 
Quadratic Reciprocity (Gauss; Fourth Proof). Let a, b, c, ... be unequal positive odd primes, whose product is n, and let m be the number of them that are ≡ 3 (mod 4); check whether n/a is a residue of a, whether n/b is a residue of b, .... The number of nonresidues found will be even when m ≡ 0, 1 (mod 4), and it will be odd if m ≡ 2, 3 (mod 4).

Gauss's fourth proof consists of proving this theorem (by comparing two formulas for the value of Gauss sums) and then restricting it to two primes. He then gives an example: Let a = 3, b = 5, c = 7, and d = 11. Three of these, 3, 7, and 11 ≡ 3 (mod 4), so m ≡ 3 (mod 4). 5×7×11 R 3; 3×7×11 R 5; 3×5×11 R 7;  and  3×5×7 N 11, so there are an odd number of nonresidues.

Eisenstein's Formulation of Quadratic Reciprocity. Assume

Then

Mordell's Formulation of Quadratic Reciprocity. Let a, b and c be integers. For every prime, p, dividing abc if the congruence 

has a nontrivial solution, then so does:

Zeta function formulation
As mentioned in the article on Dedekind zeta functions, quadratic reciprocity is equivalent to the zeta function of a quadratic field being the product of the Riemann zeta function and a certain Dirichlet L-function

Jacobi symbol

The Jacobi symbol is a generalization of the Legendre symbol; the main difference is that the bottom number has to be positive and odd, but does not have to be prime. If it is prime, the two symbols agree. It obeys the same rules of manipulation as the Legendre symbol. In particular

and if both numbers are positive and odd (this is sometimes called "Jacobi's reciprocity law"):

However, if the Jacobi symbol is 1 but the denominator is not a prime, it does not necessarily follow that the numerator is a quadratic residue of the denominator. Gauss's cases 9) - 14) above can be expressed in terms of Jacobi symbols:

and since p is prime the left hand side is a Legendre symbol, and we know whether M is a residue modulo p or not.

The formulas listed in the preceding section are true for Jacobi symbols as long as the symbols are defined. Euler's formula may be written

Example.

2 is a residue modulo the primes 7, 23 and 31:

But 2 is not a quadratic residue modulo 5, so it can't be one modulo 15. This is related to the problem Legendre had: if  then a is a non-residue modulo every prime in the arithmetic progression m + 4a, m + 8a, ..., if there are any primes in this series, but that wasn't proved until decades after Legendre.

Eisenstein's formula requires relative primality conditions (which are true if the numbers are prime)

Let  be positive odd integers such that:

Then

Hilbert symbol
The quadratic reciprocity law can be formulated in terms of the Hilbert symbol  where a and b are any two nonzero rational numbers and v runs over all the non-trivial absolute values of the rationals (the Archimedean one and the p-adic absolute values for primes p). The Hilbert symbol  is 1 or −1. (This formally resembles the residue theorem from complex analysis.)

The proof of Hilbert reciprocity reduces to checking a few special cases, and the non-trivial cases turn out to be equivalent to the main law and the two supplementary laws of quadratic reciprocity for the Legendre symbol. There is no kind of reciprocity in the Hilbert reciprocity law; its name simply indicates the historical source of the result in quadratic reciprocity. Unlike quadratic reciprocity, which requires sign conditions (namely positivity of the primes involved) and a special treatment of the prime 2, the Hilbert reciprocity law treats all absolute values of the rationals on an equal footing. Therefore, it is a more natural way of expressing quadratic reciprocity with a view towards generalization: the Hilbert reciprocity law extends with very few changes to all global fields and this extension can rightly be considered a generalization of quadratic reciprocity to all global fields.

Connection with cyclotomic fields

The early proofs of quadratic reciprocity are relatively unilluminating. The situation changed when Gauss used Gauss sums to show that quadratic fields are subfields of cyclotomic fields, and implicitly deduced quadratic reciprocity from a reciprocity theorem for cyclotomic fields. His proof was cast in modern form by later algebraic number theorists. This proof served as a template for class field theory, which can be viewed as a vast generalization of quadratic reciprocity.

Robert Langlands formulated the Langlands program, which gives a conjectural vast generalization of class field theory. He wrote:

I confess that, as a student unaware of the history of the subject and unaware of the connection with cyclotomy, I did not find the law or its so-called elementary proofs appealing. I suppose, although I would not have (and could not have) expressed myself in this way that I saw it as little more than a mathematical curiosity, fit more for amateurs than for the attention of the serious mathematician that I then hoped to become. It was only in Hermann Weyl's book on the algebraic theory of numbers that I appreciated it as anything more.

Other rings 
There are also quadratic reciprocity laws in rings other than the integers.

Gaussian integers
In his second monograph on quartic reciprocity Gauss stated quadratic reciprocity for the ring  of Gaussian integers, saying that it is a corollary of the biquadratic law in  but did not provide a proof of either theorem. Dirichlet showed that the law in  can be deduced from the law for  without using quartic reciprocity.

Let  be distinct Gaussian primes where a and c are odd and b and d are even. Then

Eisenstein integers
Consider the following third root of unity:

Let λ = a + bω and μ = c + dω be distinct Eisenstein primes where a and c are not divisible by 3 and b and d are divisible by 3. Eisenstein proved

Imaginary quadratic fields
The above laws are special cases of more general laws that hold for the ring of integers in any imaginary quadratic number field.

for an arbitrary ideal  factored into prime ideals  define

and for  define

Let  i.e.  is an integral basis for  For  with odd norm  define (ordinary) integers a, b, c, d by the equations,

and a function

If m = Nμ and n = Nν are both odd, Herglotz proved

Also, if

Then

Polynomials over a finite field
Let F be a finite field with q = pn elements, where p is an odd prime number and n is positive, and let F[x] be the ring of polynomials in one variable with coefficients in F. If  and f is irreducible, monic, and has positive degree, define the quadratic character for F[x] in the usual manner:

If  is a product of monic irreducibles let

Dedekind proved that if  are monic and have positive degrees,

Higher powers

The attempt to generalize quadratic reciprocity for powers higher than the second was one of the main goals that led 19th century mathematicians, including Carl Friedrich Gauss, Peter Gustav Lejeune Dirichlet, Carl Gustav Jakob Jacobi, Gotthold Eisenstein, Richard Dedekind, Ernst Kummer, and David Hilbert to the study of general algebraic number fields and their rings of integers; specifically Kummer invented ideals in order to state and prove higher reciprocity laws.

The ninth in the list of 23 unsolved problems which David Hilbert proposed to the Congress of Mathematicians in 1900 asked for the 
"Proof of the most general reciprocity law [f]or an arbitrary number field". Building upon work by Philipp Furtwängler, Teiji Takagi, Helmut Hasse and others, Emil Artin discovered Artin reciprocity in 1923, a general theorem for which all known reciprocity laws are special cases, and proved it in 1927.

See also 
Dedekind zeta function
Rational reciprocity law
Zolotarev's lemma

Notes

References
The Disquisitiones Arithmeticae has been translated (from Latin) into English and German. The German edition includes all of Gauss's papers on number theory: all the proofs of quadratic reciprocity, the determination of the sign of the Gauss sum, the investigations into biquadratic reciprocity, and unpublished notes. Footnotes referencing the Disquisitiones Arithmeticae are of the form "Gauss, DA, Art. n".

The two monographs Gauss published on biquadratic reciprocity have consecutively numbered sections: the first contains §§ 1–23 and the second §§ 24–76. Footnotes referencing these are of the form "Gauss, BQ, § n". 

These are in Gauss's Werke, Vol II, pp. 65–92 and 93–148. German translations are in pp. 511–533 and 534–586 of Untersuchungen über höhere Arithmetik.

Every textbook on elementary number theory (and quite a few on algebraic number theory) has a proof of quadratic reciprocity. Two are especially noteworthy:

Franz Lemmermeyer's Reciprocity Laws: From Euler to Eisenstein has many proofs (some in exercises) of both quadratic and higher-power reciprocity laws and a discussion of their history. Its immense bibliography includes literature citations for 196 different published proofs for the quadratic reciprocity law.

Kenneth Ireland and Michael Rosen's A Classical Introduction to Modern Number Theory also has many proofs of quadratic reciprocity (and many exercises), and covers the cubic and biquadratic cases as well. Exercise 13.26 (p. 202) says it all
Count the number of proofs to the law of quadratic reciprocity given thus far in this book and devise another one.

External links
 
 Quadratic Reciprocity Theorem from MathWorld
 A play comparing two proofs of the quadratic reciprocity law
 A proof of this theorem at PlanetMath
 A different proof at MathPages
 F. Lemmermeyer's chronology and bibliography of proofs of the Quadratic Reciprocity Law (332 proofs)

Algebraic number theory
Modular arithmetic
Number theory
Quadratic residue
Theorems in number theory